Nang Kham Noung, preferred as Marlene (born 1991), is a Burmese businesswoman and philanthropist. She is a Deputy CEO of the country's largest financial institution Kanbawza Bank, and the executive director of the Kanbawza Group, a major business conglomerate founded by her father, Aung Ko Win. Nang is the chair of I-KBZ Insurance, and the co-founder of the Brighter Future Myanmar Foundation, one of the biggest contributors to social and community development in Myanmar which supports heath, education, poverty reduction and youth empowerment. In 2020, she won the ASEAN Entrepreneur Award in empowering women category for her outstanding contribution to deepening financial inclusion and equality in Myanmar.

Career
In 2008, she went to areas hit by Cyclone Nargis to support cyclone victims. Visiting the camps and meeting the people that lost their homes and families has motivated her and her sister, Nang Lang Kham, to establish the foundation – Brighter Future Myanmar (BFM), the social initiative arm of the KBZ Group.

After studying in Singapore, London and Qatar, she became the fresh-faced executive director of KBZ Group at the age of 24. In 2017, she became a Deputy CEO of Kanbawza Bank. In 2018, she launched Myanmar's first bank-led mobile wallet KBZ Pay.

References

Living people
1991 births
Burmese businesspeople